Weisgerber is a German surname. Notable people with the surname include:

Anja Weisgerber, German politician and Member of the European Parliament for Bavaria
Antje Weisgerber, German film and television actress
Dick Weisgerber, American football player in the National Football League
Frédéric Weisgerber, French doctor and cartographer in Morocco
Gerd Weisgerber, German professor of mining archaeology
Jack Weisgerber, Canadian politician and businessman
James Weisgerber, Canadian Roman Catholic Archbishop
Leo Weisgerber, German linguist

German-language surnames

de:Weisgerber